The Lovers is a British television sitcom by Jack Rosenthal, starring Richard Beckinsale and Paula Wilcox as a courting couple, Geoffrey and Beryl. It was made between 1970 and 1971 by Granada Television for the ITV network. A spin-off feature film was released in 1973. The series was also given a repeat run on Channel 4 in 1996.

The show is based on the struggles of the two protagonists as they develop their relationship, particularly in the area of sex (which Beryl calls "Percy Filth," presumably a play on the name of Canadian bandleader Percy Faith). Beryl is a slightly dizzy character obsessed with marriage, while Geoffrey is instead determined to bed her.

Episodes

The series ran for 13 episodes over two series.

Series 1 (1970)
Sardine Sandwiches (27 October 1970)
The Date (3 November 1970)
Freckle Face (10 November 1970)
Brainwashing (17 November 1970)
A Pipe and a Moustache (24 November 1970)
The Truth Game (1 December 1970)

Series 2 (1971)
The Engagement (7 October 1971)
Breaking It Off (14 October 1971)
Birthday (21 October 1971)
Joint Bank Account (28 October 1971)
The Better Homes Exhibition (4 November 1971)
A Trial Marriage (11 November 1971)
The Best Laid Plans... (18 November 1971)

Cast

Film spin-off

The series was used as the basis for a feature film. The Lovers! was released in 1973 and featured Beckinsale, Wilcox and Scott, together with Susan Littler, Rosalind Ayres and John Comer (as Geoffrey's father).

See also
List of films based on British sitcoms

DVD release
The Lovers was released on DVD by Network in 2007 and featured all episodes from the two series runs.

Bibliography

References

External links

1970s British sitcoms
1970 British television series debuts
1971 British television series endings
English-language television shows
ITV sitcoms
Television series by ITV Studios
Television shows adapted into films
Television shows produced by Granada Television